The England cricket team toured the West Indies between January and March 2019 to play three Tests, five One Day Internationals (ODIs) and three Twenty20 International (T20I) matches. The series included England's first Test match in Saint Lucia, when they played at the Daren Sammy Cricket Ground. It was also England's first tour to the West Indies to play all three formats of international cricket since they visited in 2009. The ODI fixtures were part of both teams' preparation for the 2019 Cricket World Cup.

The West Indies won the first two Test matches, taking an unassailable lead in the series, and therefore winning the Wisden Trophy. It was their first Test series win against England since 2009. However, the West Indies captain Jason Holder was suspended for the third and final Test of the series, after the team's slow over-rate in the second Test. Kraigg Brathwaite was named as the West Indies' captain for the third Test in Holder's place. The West Indies won the series 2–1, after England won the third Test by 232 runs.

During the ODI series, multiple individual and team records were broken by both sides. England's captain Eoin Morgan became the first batsman for the England team to score 6,000 runs in ODIs. Chris Gayle became the second batsman for the West Indies, after Brian Lara, to score 10,000 runs in ODIs. The ODI series was drawn 2–2, after the third match was washed out, finishing as a no result.

For the T20I series, the West Indies retained players that were selected for the ODI matches, with Jason Holder named as the T20I captain in place of their regular T20I captain Carlos Brathwaite. During the second match, the West Indies were bowled out for 45, which was the second-lowest total in T20Is and the lowest by a Full Member nation. England won the T20I series 3–0.

Squads

Olly Stone was ruled out of England's Test squad with a back injury, and was replaced in the squad by Mark Wood. Ahead of the second Test, England's Adil Rashid flew home to attend the birth of his second child. Keemo Paul was added to the West Indies' squad for the third Test, after Jason Holder was suspended.

Shannon Gabriel was not originally named in the West Indies' ODI squad, but was added to the team after injuries to Rovman Powell and Keemo Paul. However, during the third Test, Gabriel was heard saying a homophobic remark towards England's captain Joe Root. As a result, the International Cricket Council (ICC) suspended Gabriel for four ODI matches. John Campbell, Carlos Brathwaite and Sheldon Cottrell were added to the West Indies' ODI squad, following injuries to Evin Lewis, Rovman Powell and Keemo Paul, and Shannon Gabriel's suspension. Kemar Roach was ruled out of the West Indies' ODI squad due to injury, and was replaced by Andre Russell for the fourth and fifth ODIs.

Sam Curran was added to England's T20I squad, after Moeen Ali announced he would fly home after the last ODI match to rest ahead of the 2019 Indian Premier League. Obed McCoy was added to the West Indies' T20I squad, after Andre Russell was forced to pull out of the side due to injury.

Tour matches

Two-day match: West Indies President's XI vs England

Two-day match: West Indies President's XI vs England

50-over match: UWI Vice Chancellor's XI vs England

Test series

1st Test

2nd Test

3rd Test

ODI series

1st ODI

2nd ODI

3rd ODI

4th ODI

5th ODI

T20I series

1st T20I

2nd T20I

3rd T20I

Notes

References

External links
 Series home at ESPN Cricinfo

2019 in English cricket
2019 in West Indian cricket
International cricket competitions in 2018–19
English cricket tours of the West Indies